Epharmottomena is a genus of moths of the family Noctuidae. The genus was erected by Oscar John in 1909.

Species
 Epharmottomena albiluna Hampson, 1899
 Epharmottomena eremophila Rebel, 1895
 Epharmottomena gelida Brandt, 1939
 Epharmottomena gorgonula Wiltshire, 1979
 Epharmottomena nana Staudinger, 1884
 Epharmottomena tenera Brandt, 1939

References

Calpinae